George Clubb (1844 – 29 March 1924) was a Scottish-born Australian politician.

Born at Fochabers in Morayshire to builder John Clubb and Ann Newlands, his family moved to Sydney around 1851. He was educated at Pyrmont and became apprentice to his father in the building trade. He lived in Balmain as a builder from 1870, and in the 1880s established himself as a real estate agent in Rozelle. He married Ida Keynott in 1880; they had nine children. He was a long-serving Balmain alderman, and was mayor four times. In 1889 he was elected to the New South Wales Legislative Assembly as a Free Trade member for Balmain, but he was defeated in 1891. He continued to work as an estate agent and auctioneer until his retirement in 1923. He died at Drummoyne in 1924.

References

 

1844 births
1924 deaths
Members of the New South Wales Legislative Assembly
Free Trade Party politicians
Mayors of Balmain